Yeonbaek County (Yeonbaek-gun(延白郡)) or Yonbaek County (Yonbaek-gun) was a county in Hwanghae Province, Korea. It was established in 1914 by uniting Yonan County and Paechon County. It was divided during the Division of Korea. The part of Yeonbaek county under South Korean authorities were administered under Gyeonggi Province. During the Korean War, North Korea took all of Yeonbaek County, and after briefly establishing the regions formerly under South Korean control as South Yeonbaek county(남연백군), North Korea disestablished Yeonbaek County and reestablished former Yonan County and Paechon County in 1952.

Administrative division
The county had 1 Eup, 19 Myeons and 175 Ris.

Yonan Eup
The region was famous for its wine.

Gwaegungmyeon
The region was famous for its silk.

Geumsanmyeon
The region was famous for its beans and pots.

Dochonmyeon
The region had an old fortress.

Mokdanmyeon
The region harvested weed, ginseng and tobacco.

Bongbukmyeon
The region had a gold mine.

Bongseomyeon
The region was where the cranes live.

Seoksanmyeon
The region had a lot of fields and was famous for its rice.

Songbongmyeon
Temple called ungyesa existed here.

Onjeongmyeon
Ginseng and cotton were its specialties.

Yongdomyeon
The region had tons of fertile fields.

Unsanmyeon
A rock that is said to be where Gongmin of Goryeo was born existed here.

Yugokmyeon
The region had some cattle.

Unchonmyeon
The region was famous for god quality crops such as beans. Also, it had a onsen.

Haeryongmyeon
The region was known for its scenery.

Haesongmyeon
The region was known for its fishing event in April.

Haewolmyeon
The region was one of the top 4 regions that produced gold out of all the regions in Korea.

Honammyeon
The region had some dolmen ruins.

Hodongmyeon
Ancient pottery was discovered here.

Hwaseongmyeon
There was a temple that is said to be founded by  Gongmin of Goryeo, which later disappeared.

Education
In 1929, due to the 1 myeon 1 school policy, every up and myon had its own elementary schools. In 1934, the yonan agricultural school was established.
As of 1938, the county had 64 Seodangs.

Religion
As of 1939,there were 50 Buddhist temples, 19 Roman Catholic cathedrals and 19 Protestant churches.

Population census
In 1942, there were 35,953 families and 199,942 people living in the county which was the most populous county in the province.

References

╋
Former subdivisions of North Korea
States and territories established in 1914
States and territories disestablished in 1952
Counties of Korea